Grzęzienko  is a village in the administrative district of Gmina Dobra, within Łobez County, West Pomeranian Voivodeship, in north-western Poland.

References

Villages in Łobez County